Idols West Africa is the West African version of the Idol series franchise. Based in Nigeria, it is a talent contest to find a recording artiste, and aired on M-Net in 2007. Like the Pan-Arab entry to the series, the show incorporated countries throughout the West African region.

Season 1

The show is presented in English, hosted by Mike Majic. The three judges are: Nigerian Dede Mabiaku, Ghanaian Abrewa Nana and American Dan Foster.

Themes
April 2: My Idol
April 9: Old School
April 16: Current Hits
April 23: 80s & 90s
April 30: African Songs
May 7: My Idols
May 14: Producer's Choice
May 21: Ultimate Wishlist
May 27: Grand Finale

Finals elimination chart

Criticism
Despite the title, the show was dubbed 'Nigerian Idol' by the public.  Most of the finalists - bar Liberian Jerrilyn Mulbar - were Nigerian. Most of the auditions were held in Nigerian cities (Lagos, Calabar and Abuja). Only one West African city outside Nigeria - Accra - hosted them.

Dan Foster was criticized for not showing up at the Ghana auditions. Fellow judge Dede Mabiaku (popularly known as the Nigerian Simon Cowell) also came under fire for his attitude towards an auditionee who had arrived clad in white briefs in a bid to imitate his hero Fela Kuti. Viewers were shocked to hear Mabiaku call the auditionee a liar, and accuse him of being on "some wrong pills". Foster attempted to calm Mabiaku, who continued to yell insults at the auditionee before asking him to leave, without giving the other judges a chance to vote either "Yes" or "No"

The winner of the series, Timi Dakolo, is yet to release his debut album with Sony BMG, as announced by the producers of the show.

References

External links
 Official Site
 Idol Finalists
 Eric

Idols (franchise)
2007 Nigerian television series debuts
Television series by Fremantle (company)
2007 Nigerian television series endings
2000s Nigerian television series
Cultural depictions of Fela Kuti
Non-British television series based on British television series
M-Net original programming